Fukuoka at-large district is a constituency of the House of Councillors in the Diet of Japan (national legislature). It consists of the entire prefecture of Fukuoka and is represented by four Councillors electing two per election by single non-transferable vote.

Between 1947 and 1995 Gunma was represented by six Councillors. The 1994 electoral reform reapportioned the number of seats, increasing the number of Councillors in Miyagi, Saitama, Kanagawa and Gifu by two each (one per election) and reducing the number in Hokkaido, Hyogo and Fukuoka. Since the election of 2001 Fukuoka, like most two-member districts, has split seats between the two major parties, the Liberal Democratic Party (LDP) and the Democratic Party of Japan (DPJ).

Elected Councillors

Recent election results

References 

Districts of the House of Councillors (Japan)